The Brick Church Complex is a historic Dutch Reformed church at Brick Church Road and NY 306 in New Hempstead, Rockland County, New York. The complex consists of the church, cemetery, school, and superintendent's house. The church was built in 1856 and has three brick elevations and a stone rear elevation.  It features a large wood frame bell tower built in the late 19th century. It was listed on the National Register of Historic Places in 1984.

Background
The "Reformed Dutch Church of West Hempstead," originally known as Kikiat and presently known as the Brick Church, was established in 1774.

Gallery

References

External links

Fina a grave
Visit Brick Church

Reformed Church in America
Churches on the National Register of Historic Places in New York (state)
Churches completed in 1856
19th-century Calvinist and Reformed churches
Churches in Rockland County, New York
Ramapos
National Register of Historic Places in Rockland County, New York
1774 establishments in the Province of New York
19th-century churches in the United States